Loera is a surname of Spanish origin. Notable people with the surname include:

Alfonso Loera (born 1978), Mexican footballer
Olga Loera (born 1985), Mexican-American glamour model

References

Surnames of Spanish origin